NGC 1984 (also known as ESO 56-SC132) is an open cluster associated with an emission nebula, it is located in the constellation Dorado in the Large Magellanic Cloud. It was discovered by John Herschel on 16 December 1835. The apparent magnitude is 9.9 and its size is 1.50 by 1.20 arc minutes.

NGC 1984 contains a star called NGC 1984-16 which is at these co-ordinates 05 27 41.0 -69 08 06.

See also 
 Open Cluster 
 List of NGC objects (1001–2000)
 Dorado (constellation)

References

External links 
 
 
 SEDS

emission nebulae
Open clusters
ESO 56-SC132
1984
Dorado (constellation)
Astronomical objects discovered in 1835
Discoveries by John Herschel
Large Magellanic Cloud